Jan Männer (27 October 1982 – 26 September 2022) was a German former professional footballer who played as a midfielder.

References

External links
 

Living people
1982 births
2022 deaths
People from Emmendingen
Sportspeople from Freiburg (region)
Association football midfielders
German footballers
FC Emmendingen players
Bahlinger SC players
SC Freiburg players
Karlsruher SC players
SC Paderborn 07 players
Bundesliga players
2. Bundesliga players
Germany under-21 international footballers
Germany B international footballers
Footballers from Baden-Württemberg